The 2022 Belgian Road Cycling Cup (known as the Exterioo Cycling Cup for sponsorship reasons) is the seventh edition of the Belgian Road Cycling Cup. With the inclusion of the Dutch races Ronde van Drenthe and Veenendaal–Veenendaal, this marks the first season in which the Belgian Road Cycling Cup includes races outside of Belgium.

Events 
The event schedule was revealed on 9 February 2022. With respect to the previous season, the Grote Prijs Jef Scherens, Halle–Ingooigem, the Schaal Sels, and the Memorial Rik Van Steenbergen were removed, the last three of which were not held in 2021 for various reasons, resulting in the 2021 season only having eight races. These four races were replaced with the Ronde van Drenthe, the Veenendaal–Veenendaal Classic, the Elfstedenronde, and the Circuit Franco–Belge to keep the total number of races at eleven, all of which are also part of the 2022 UCI Europe Tour.

Race results

Le Samyn

Grote Prijs Jean-Pierre Monseré

Ronde van Drenthe

Veenendaal–Veenendaal Classic

Antwerp Port Epic

Circuit de Wallonie

Grote Prijs Marcel Kint

Finalcup standings

References

External links 
  

Belgian Road Cycling Cup
Belgian Road Cycling Cup
Road Cycling Cup